Judas Kiss is the fourth solo album by Kee Marcello, the former guitarist in the Swedish hard rock band Europe. It was released on April 5, 2013.

Track listing
"Zombie" – 3:56
"Dog Eat Dog" – 4:02
"Starless Sky" – 4:49
"I'm Stoned" – 4:22
"Dead End Highway" – 5:04
"Judas Kiss" – 4:24
"And Forever More" (featuring Liv Moon) – 4:29
"Coming Home" – 4:43
"Get On Top" – 4:38
"The Harder They Come" – 3:08
"Dead Give Away" – 5:05
"Love Will Tear Us Apart" – 4:24
"Metal Box" – 5:03

References 

Kee Marcello albums
2013 albums